Lagunaria patersonia is a species of tree in the family Malvaceae. It is commonly known as the pyramid tree, Norfolk Island hibiscus, Queensland white oak, sally wood, or simply as white oak on Norfolk Island. Its seed capsules are filled with irritating hairs giving rise to common names, itchy bomb tree, and cow itch tree.

References

Bombacoideae
Endemic flora of Australia
Flora of Norfolk Island
Garden plants of Australia
Ornamental trees
Taxa named by Henry Cranke Andrews